The knockout phase of the 2009–10 UEFA Champions League began on 16 February and concluded on 22 May 2010 with the final won by Internazionale against Bayern Munich 2–0 at the Santiago Bernabéu Stadium in Madrid. The knockout phase involved the sixteen teams who finished in the top two in each of their groups in the group stage.

Times are CET/CEST, as listed by UEFA (local times are in parentheses).

Format
Each tie in the knockout phase, apart from the final, was played over two legs, with each team playing one leg at home. The team that had the higher aggregate score over the two legs progressed to the next round. In the event that aggregate scores finished level, the team that scored more goals away from home over the two legs progressed. If away goals were also equal, 30 minutes of extra time were played. If there were goals scored during extra time and the aggregate score was still level, the visiting team qualified by virtue of more away goals scored. If no goals were scored during extra time, the tie was settled via a penalty shoot-out.

In the draw for the round of 16, matches were played between the winners of one group and the runners-up of a different group. The only restriction on the drawing of teams in the round of 16 was that the teams could not be from the same national association or have played in the same group in the group stages. From the quarter-finals onwards, these restrictions did not apply.

In the final, the tie was played over just one leg at a neutral venue. If scores were level at the end of normal time in the final, extra time was played, followed by penalties if scores remained tied.

Qualified teams

Bracket

Round of 16
The draw for the competition's round of 16 was held on 18 December 2009. The first legs of the round of 16 were played on 16, 17, 23 and 24 February, and the second legs were played on 9, 10, 16 and 17 March 2010.

CSKA Moscow became the first Russian team to advance to the quarter-finals under the present format (16 teams in the knockout stage).

|}

Matches

Barcelona won 5–1 on aggregate.

Bordeaux won 3–1 on aggregate.

Internazionale won 3–1 on aggregate.

4–4 on aggregate; Bayern Munich won on away goals.

CSKA Moscow won 3–2 on aggregate.

Lyon won 2–1 on aggregate.

Arsenal won 6–2 on aggregate.

Manchester United won 7–2 on aggregate.

Quarter-finals
The draw for the quarter-finals took place in Nyon, Switzerland, on 19 March 2010. There was no seeding and no country protection, meaning that it was an entirely random draw.

The first legs were played on 30 and 31 March 2010, and the second legs were played on 6 and 7 April 2010.

|}

Matches

Lyon won 3–2 on aggregate.

4–4 on aggregate; Bayern Munich won on away goals.

Barcelona won 6–3 on aggregate.

Internazionale won 2–0 on aggregate.

Semi-finals
The draw for the semi-finals took place immediately after the draw for the quarter-finals. The first legs were played on 20 and 21 April 2010, with the second legs on 27 and 28 April 2010. There were fears that the first legs would have to be postponed due to the eruptions of the volcano at Eyjafjallajökull in Iceland. On 18 April, UEFA issued a statement that the matches would go ahead and that the teams would have to make alternate travel arrangements.

|}

Matches

Bayern Munich won 4–0 on aggregate.

Internazionale won 3–2 on aggregate.

Final

The 2010 UEFA Champions League Final was the fourth to be held at the Santiago Bernabéu Stadium in Madrid, Spain, after the 1957, 1969 and 1980 finals. It also was the first to be held on a Saturday.

Notes

References

External links
2009–10 UEFA Champions League, UEFA.com

Knockout Phase
2009-10